Tatoosh Peak is a summit in the Tatoosh Range which is a sub-range of the Cascade Range. It's the highest point in the Tatoosh Wilderness, a protected area which is managed by Gifford Pinchot National Forest. The name tatoosh derives from Chinook Jargon which means breast. Precipitation runoff from the peak drains into tributaries of the Cowlitz River.

Climate
Tatoosh Peak is located in the marine west coast climate zone of western North America.  Most weather fronts originate in the Pacific Ocean, and travel northeast toward the Cascade Mountains. As fronts approach, they are forced upward by the peaks of the Cascade Range (Orographic lift), causing them to drop their moisture in the form of rain or snowfall onto the Cascades. As a result, the west side of the North Cascades experiences high precipitation, especially during the winter months in the form of snowfall. Due to its temperate climate and proximity to the Pacific Ocean, areas west of the Cascade Crest very rarely experience temperatures below  or above . During winter months, weather is usually cloudy, but, due to high pressure systems over the Pacific Ocean that intensify during summer months, there is often little or no cloud cover during the summer. Because of maritime influence, snow tends to be wet and heavy, resulting in high avalanche danger.

History
In 1932, a fire lookout was built on Tatoosh Peak. Author Martha Hardy wrote about her experiences keeping watch at the fire lookout in her 1947 book Tatoosh.

Hiking

Tatoosh Peak is accessible from the south via the Tatoosh Trail (#161). A spur (#161A) of the Tatoosh Trail extends to the location of a former fire lookout that Martha Hardy wrote about, although only the foundations of the lookout building remain.

References

External links
Tatoosh Wilderness U.S. Forest Service]

Cascade Range
Mountains of Lewis County, Washington
Mountains of Washington (state)
Chinook Jargon place names